Datuk Sebastian Ting Chiew Yew is a Malaysian lawyer and politician from the Sarawak United Peoples' Party (SUPP), a component party of the ruling Gabungan Parti Sarawak (GPS) coalition. He has served as State Deputy Minister of Tourism, Creative Industry and Performing Arts of Sarawak in charge of Tourism in the GPS administration under Chief Minister Abang Abdul Rahman Johari Abang Openg and Minister Abdul Karim Rahman Hamzah since January 2022 and Member of the Sarawak State Legislative Assembly (MLA) for Piasau since May 2016. He served as State Deputy Minister of Tourism, Arts and Culture of Sarawak from August 2019 to December 2021. He has also served as Secretary-General of SUPP since September 2014.

Early life and education 
Ting attended the North London Polytechnic between 1979 and 1982 before graduating with a Bachelor of Laws (LL.B.) with second class honours, first division. Immediately after, he pursued his postgraduate studies at Darwin College, Cambridge and subsequently graduated with a Master of Laws (LL.M.) with second class honours, second division. He returned to Malaysia upon completion of his studies and became a legal assistant at Wan Ullok Jugah Chin & Co Advocates in September 1984. From 1988 to April 2004, he served as the Managing Partner of the same law firm.

Political career 
Ting was political secretary to former Minister of Plantation Industries and Commodities of Malaysia, Miri MP and former SUPP president Peter Chin Fah Kui for a period of nine years between May 2004 and April 2009 and later when Chin was reassigned as Minister of Energy, Green Technology and Water until May 2013. After Chin's retirement from public office in 2014, then-SUPP secretary-general and Ting's direct predecessor, Professor Dr. Sim Kui Hian, was elected as Chin's successor and Ting was subsequently made secretary-general. Prior to this, he had already been serving the party in the capacity of Publicity and Information secretary. He first tried his luck in an election for public office when he was nominated by SUPP as its candidate for the Miri parliamentary seat, but failed to win.

In Ting's second election, he managed to win back the Piasau state seat from the Democratic Action Party's (DAP) Sarawak state liaison committee secretary, Alan Ling Sie Kiong, in a battle dubbed the "Battle of secretaries-general". In late 2017, Ting retained his post as SUPP secretary-general for a third term between 2018 and 2020 after the party received no nomination forms for the office. In the historic 14th Malaysian general election that took place in May 2018, Ting once again contested for the Miri parliamentary seat but yet again failed to wrestle the seat from the incumbent, Michael Teo Yu Keng of PKR. The SUPP's disastrous showing in the election, where it only won one of the seven parliamentary seats it contested, led to some calling for Ting to resign as secretary-general, citing his supposed no-show post-election.

On 22 August 2019, it was announced by the Chief Minister of Sarawak, Abang Abdul Rahman Johari Abang Openg, that in a minor cabinet reshuffle, Ting was appointed as assistant Minister for Tourism, Arts and Culture. Ting's predecessor and long-time assistant minister in the Government of Sarawak, Lee Kim Shin, was promoted to full ministership.

On 30 December 2021, Chief Minister Abang Johari unveiled his new Cabinet lineup. Ting was then appointed as Assistant Minister of Tourism, Creative Industry and Performing Arts in charge of Tourism on 4 January 2022.

Election results 

{| class="wikitable" style="margin:0.5em ; font-size:90%"
|+ Sarawak State Legislative Assembly
!|Year
!|Constituency
!colspan=2|
!|Votes
!|Pct
!colspan=2|Opponent(s)
!|Votes
!|Pct
!|Ballots cast
!|Majority
!|Turnout
|-
|2016
| rowspan="5" |Piasau
| |
|Sebastian Ting Chiew Yew (SUPP)|7,799|57.83%| |
|Alan Ling Sie Kiong (DAP)
|style="text-align:right;"|5,687
|style="text-align:right;"|42.17%
|style="text-align:right;"|13,634
|style="text-align:right;"|2,112
|style="text-align:right;"|64.55%
|-
| rowspan="4" |2021
| rowspan="4"  |
| rowspan="4" |Sebastian Ting Chiew Yew (SUPP)| rowspan="4" style="text-align:right;" |6,790| rowspan="4" style="text-align:right;" | 66.61%| |
|Peter Hee (DAP)
|1,802
|17.68%
| rowspan="4" style="text-align:right;"|10.194
| rowspan="4" style="text-align:right;"|4,988
| rowspan="4" style="text-align:right;"|48.59%
|-
|bgcolor="" |
|Teo Jia Jun (PSB)
|style="text-align:right;"|816
|style="text-align:right;"|8.00%
|-
|bgcolor="" |
|Chung Siew Yen (PBK)
|style="text-align:right;"|665
|style="text-align:right;"|6.52%
|-
|bgcolor="" |
|Hanim Jaraee (ASPIRASI)
|style="text-align:right;"|121
|style="text-align:right;"|1.19%
|-
|}

 Honours 
 :
  Commander of the Order of Meritorious Service (PJN) – Datuk (2017)
  :
  Knight Companion of the Order of the Crown of Pahang (DIMP) – Dato'''' (2009)

See also 
 Miri (federal constituency)
 Piasau (state constituency)

References 

Living people
People from Sarawak
People from Miri
20th-century Malaysian people
Malaysian politicians of Chinese descent
Members of the Sarawak State Legislative Assembly
21st-century Malaysian politicians
Sarawak United Peoples' Party politicians
20th-century Malaysian lawyers
Sarawak politicians
Commanders of the Order of Meritorious Service
Alumni of the University of Cambridge
Alumni of Darwin College, Cambridge
Alumni of the University of North London
Year of birth missing (living people)
21st-century Malaysian lawyers